Marko Paunović (born 28 January 1988) is a Serbian football centre-back.

Career
He had been a member of Napredak Kruševac from 2010 to 2015. After he was injured he returned to the squad and made his Jelen SuperLiga debut in an away match on 28 May 2014.

After signing for FC Haka in April 2018, he left the club again at the end of 2018.

Personal life
Paunović appeared in spot of "Prolom voda" company, with girlfriend Ana Tenjović.

References

External links
 
 Marko Paunović stats at utakmica.rs

1988 births
Living people
People from Zaječar
Association football defenders
Serbian footballers
Serbian expatriate footballers
FK Timok players
FK Napredak Kruševac players
FK Novi Pazar players
FK Jagodina players
FC Haka players
Luftëtari Gjirokastër players
IF Gnistan players
Serbian First League players
Serbian SuperLiga players
Ykkönen players
Serbian expatriate sportspeople in Finland
Serbian expatriate sportspeople in Albania
Expatriate footballers in Finland
Expatriate footballers in Albania